Abasolo is one of the 38 municipalities of Coahuila, in north-eastern Mexico. The municipal seat lies at Abasolo. The municipality covers an area of 645.9 km².

As of 2005, the municipality had a total population of 991.

Climate

References

Municipalities of Coahuila